The 1938 FA Cup final was contested by Preston North End and Huddersfield Town at Wembley Stadium. Preston, losing finalists the previous year, won by a single goal. This was their second win in the competition.

Background
After 29 minutes of extra time it was still 0–0 and BBC commentator Thomas Woodrooffe said "if there's a goal scored now, I'll eat my hat". Seconds later, Preston were awarded a penalty, from which George Mutch scored the winning goal; Woodrooffe kept his promise, though it was one made of cake and marzipan. Bill Shankly (who played in that game for the Preston side) recalls that special moment in his autobiography from 1976: "The ball hit the bar, which was square then, took the paint off it, screamed into the middle of the goal and ran down the back of the net." And then adds: "The paint is on the ball to this day. I saw it again in 1971, when Liverpool reached the final and played Arsenal. When we were preparing for Wembley, Tommy Smith, who was the Preston captain in 1938, came to the training ground at Melwood and showed the ball to his namesake, Tommy Smith, the Liverpool captain in 1971."

This was the first FA Cup final to be broadcast on television, by the BBC. It was a repeat of the 1922 FA Cup Final. This time the scores were reversed but once again a penalty was needed to separate the two sides.

Three of the players who participated in the final (Andy Beattie and Bill Shankly of Preston and Eddie Boot of Huddersfield) would all manage Huddersfield within 20 years of this final.

The last surviving member of the winning team was Bobby Beattie, who died in September 2002 at the age of 86.

Match details

Road to Wembley

Preston North End

Huddersfield Town

References

External links
FA Cup Final lineups

FA Cup Finals
FA Cup Final
FA Cup Final 1938
FA Cup Final 1938
FA Cup Final
FA Cup Final